Reinier or Reiner Por (died 7 January 1653 at Fort Frederik Hendrik, near Mahébourg) was the Dutch opperhoofd or governor of Mauritius from 1648 to 1653. Five years after his death the first Dutch colony  was briefly abandoned, to be re-established at the same location in Grand Port in 1666.

See also
List of colonial heads of Mauritius
Dutch colonization of Mauritius (1638-1710)

References

History of Mauritius: The Dutch
Fort Frederik Hendrik heritage site

Year of birth missing
1653 deaths
Dutch Governors of Mauritius